Exalphus is a genus of beetles in the family Cerambycidae.

Species 
Exalphus contains the following species:
 Exalphus aurivillii (Lane, 1970)
 Exalphus biannulatus (Aurivillius, 1921)
 Exalphus cavifrons (Bates, 1872)
 Exalphus cicatricornis Schmid, 2014
 Exalphus colasi (Lane, 1965)
 Exalphus confusus Restello, 2001
 Exalphus docquini Tavakilian & Neouze, 2013
 Exalphus foveatus (Marinoni & Martins, 1978)
 Exalphus gounellei (Lane, 1973)
 Exalphus guaraniticus (Lane, 1955)
 Exalphus leuconotus (Thomson, 1860)
 Exalphus lichenophorus (Lane, 1965)
 Exalphus malleri (Lane, 1955)
 Exalphus simplex (Galileo & Martins, 1998)
 Exalphus solangae Santana & Monne, 2014
 Exalphus spilonotus Restello, 2001
 Exalphus vicinus Galileo & Martins, 2003
 Exalphus zellibori (Lane, 1955)

References

Acanthoderini